Fayga Perla Ostrower (née Krakowski; 14 September 1920, Łódź, — 13 September 2001, Rio de Janeiro) was a Polish-Brazilian engraver, painter, designer, illustrator, art theorist and university professor.

Biography
Fayga Ostrower was born Fayga Perla Krakowski to a Jewish family at Łódź. In 1921 the family moved to Elberfeld and Barmen in Germany, where Ostrower attended primary and secondary schools. In the early 1930s, following difficulties with the German authorities, the family sought refuge in Belgium, and emigrated to Brazil in 1934, where they took up residence in Nilópolis. Ostrower began work as a secretary while studying art at the Fine Arts Association, and in 1946 attended design classes at the Getúlio Vargas Foundation’s Brazilian Society of Fine and Graphic Arts, where she studied metal and wood engraving, and art history, with tutors Axel Leskoschek, Tomás Santa Rosa, Carlos Oswald and Anna Levy. In 1955 she spent a year in New York through a Fulbright Scholarship, engraving under the tutelage of Stanley Hayter.

Ostrower exhibited and won prizes in the international Art Biennials of São Paulo (1951 to 1967), Venice (1958 and 1962) and Mexico (1960).

In 2002 the Fayga Ostrower Institute was founded in Rio de Janeiro in memory of Ostrower, to house her works and documents, and to provide for creative, fine art and interdisciplinary study.

In 1941 Ostrower married marxist activist Heinz Ostrower, both becoming naturalized in 1951. They had a son Carl Robert (b. 1949), and daughter Anna Leonor (b. 1952).

Teaching
Between 1954 and 1970 Ostrower lectured in Composition and Critical Analysis at the Museum of Modern Art, Rio de Janeiro. In the 1960s she taught at the Slade School of Fine Art, London, and in 1964 at Spelman College, Atlanta. Subsequently, she held posts within postgraduate programmes within various Brazilian universities.  Consecutively she developed art courses for workers and community centres, and gave lectures at various cultural institutions.

Selected exhibitions

Joint
1951 to 1967 – São Paulo Biennial
1957 – Modern Art in Brazil (Buenos Aires, Rosário, Santiago, Lima)
1958 and 1962 – Venice Biennial
1960 – Mexico Biennial
1960 – Certame Latin American Engraving Exhibition, Buenos Aires
1965 – Contemporary Brazilian Art (London, Vienna, Bonn)
1965 – Contemporary Brazilian Engravers (Cornell University)
2012 – Centro Cultural Rio de Janeiro: Diálogos

Solo
1955 – Pan-American Union, Washington
1957 – San Francisco Fine Arts Museum
1959 – Stedelijk Museum, Amsterdam
1960 – Art Institute of Chicago
2011–12 – Museu Lasar Segall, São Paulo

Collections
 Museum of Contemporary Art, University of São Paulo
 Institute of Contemporary Arts, London
 Victoria and Albert Museum, London
 Albertina Museum, Vienna
 Museum of Modern Art, New York
 Fine Arts Museum, Philadelphia
 Library of Congress, Washington
 Art Institute of Chicago
 Fayga Ostrower Institute, Rio de Janeiro
Museu de Arte Moderna, Lodz

Organisational involvement
1963 to 1966 – President of the Associação Brasileira de Artes Plásticas (Brazilian Association of Arts)
1978 to 1988 – Director of the Brazilian committee of Unesco's International Society of Education Through Art (INSEA)
Honorary Member of the Academy of Art and Design, Florence
 1982 to 1988 – member of the Conselho Estadual de Cultura (Cultural Board of Rio de Janeiro State)

Honours
1972 – Order of Rio Branco Award
1998 – Order of Cultural Merit (Brazil)
 1999 – Grande Prêmio de Artes Plásticas (Grand National Art Prize – Ministério da Cultura do Brasil)

Bibliography
 Ostrower, Fayga (1983); Universos da arte; Editora Campus, Rio de Janeiro. 
Ostrower, Fayga (1990); Acasos e criacao artistic; Editora Campus, Rio de Janeiro. 
 Puerto, Cecilia (1996); Latin American Women Artists, Kahlo and Look Who Else:, pp. 1407–8; Greenwood Press.

References

1920 births
2001 deaths
20th-century Brazilian painters
20th-century Brazilian women artists
20th-century printmakers
Artists from Łódź
Modern printmakers
Brazilian printmakers
Jewish artists
Brazilian illustrators
20th-century Polish Jews
Jewish emigrants from Nazi Germany to Brazil
Women printmakers